Cacaliopsis is a monotypic genus of flowering plants in the aster family, Asteraceae, containing the single species Cacaliopsis nardosmia (formerly Cacalia nardosmia). It is known by the common name silvercrown. It is native to western North America.

Description 
This species is a perennial herb growing from rhizomes with a fibrous root system. The leaves are alternately arranged, and most are near the base of the stem. The blades have lobes subdivided into toothed segments. They are hairy to woolly, especially on the undersides. They contain up to 50 long yellow or orange disc florets and no ray florets. The fruit is a veiny cylindrical cypsela with a long pappus of many barbed, white bristles.

Distribution and habitat 
It is distributed from southern British Columbia to northern California, along both the Cascades and northern Coast Ranges. The plant grows in oak and pine forests and meadows, sometimes on serpentine soils.

References

External links

Cacaliopsis nardosmia. Burke Museum. University of Washington.
Cacaliopsis nardosmia. CalPhotos.

Senecioneae
Monotypic Asteraceae genera
Flora of North America